Pune Mahanagar Parivahan Mahamandal Ltd (PMPML) is the public transport bus service provider for the city of Pune, India.

It operates 486 routes around the Pune Metropolitan Region including 51 Rainbow BRT routes that partially ply on the 4 bus rapid transit corridors. As of mid'22, PMPML became the fleet in the country that only runs on Green fuel with CNG and Electric Buses. Since 2019, PMPML has been operating both 9 and 12 m Electric AC Buses at the same fare as regular buses. PMPML is the only fleet in the country to operate near around 400 Electric buses daily, providing all necessary infrastructures and leading towards most reliable public transport service in the country.

History

Early history 
Pune Nagarpalika, the predecessor of the Pune Municipal Corporation (PMC), conceived the idea of a public transport system for the city in the 1940s which materialized when the Regional Transport Office gave its nod for M/s. Silver Jubilee Motors to take up the charge. The service that began with 4 routes with 20 buses already had increased to 46 buses by 1948.

PMT and PCMT
After the transformation of Pune Nagarpalika into PMC in 1950, the civic body took over the service. Pune Municipal Transport (PMT), as it was named after the takeover, started with a fleet of 57 buses that plied on 14 routes.

The public transport provider for the industrial city, Pimpri Chinchwad Municipal Transport (PCMT), was founded on 4 March 1974 with a fleet of 8 buses plying between Pimpri and Bhosari. PCMT saw rapid expansion and already by 1988, it had a fleet of 101 buses plying on 13 routes.

Merger 
A proposal for merger of PMT and PCMT into a unified company to serve the larger metropolitan regions was proposed as early as 1992, when the general body of the PMC passed a resolution supporting such merger. However, the PCMC only considered a merger in 2003. The merger was formally announced in April 2007 and PMPML as it exists today came into being on 19 October 2007.

Operations 

PMPML has a fleet of 2000 buses maintained at 9 CNG bus depots and 4 electric bus depots, which ferry around 900,000 passengers every day. There is no diesel bus running in the fleet. 12-meter electric buses are deployed on all major routes at high frequency. 9-meter CNG buses travel numerous roads, including city centers, and also provide transport to students of PMC schools. Distant towns like Lonavala, Paud, Shirval, Jejuri, Yawat, Ranjangaon MIDC, Junnar, etc. are becoming part of the service. PMPML also provides a special electric bus service to Infosys employees commuting from Pune city and Pimpri-Chinchwad to the Hinjawadi IT hub and back.

PMPML acquired the first lot of 25 electric buses in February 2019 and the second lot of 50 electric buses in August 2019. As of August 2022, the fleet size of electric buses is 395. PMPML also plans to acquire 1000 such electric buses by the end of 2023.

Services 

PMPML operates regular scheduled services daily between 5:30 am and midnight on 371 routes. The frequencies on individual routes vary greatly according to demand. Certain long distance routes are serviced only a few times per day. Some of these routes are partially or fully run on the BRT corridors under the brand name Rainbow BRTS. 

 
PMPML also operates night buses after midnight on 7 routes. On the occasion of International Women's Day 2018, PMPML launched 'Tejaswini' (Marathi: तेजस्विनी; radiant) bus services exclusively for women which were well received by women commuters. There 218 daily Tejaswini services during the morning and afternoon peak hours on eight of the busiest routes. PMPML also runs special services for tourists under the name 'Pune Darshan' as well as airport services from Rajiv Gandhi IT Park, Hinjawadi to Pune Airport.

Fare

Single journey tickets are valid for a single trip between any two points. They are issued as paper tickets and are to be bought on board from the conductor. The fare depends on the distance of travel (see table below) and needs to be paid in cash. Children between the ages of three and twelve years travel at reduced fares, called 'half ticket', while no fares are charged for children younger than three. Fares on the night bus services are higher.

PMPML offers daily, weekly, fortnightly, quarterly and annual traveling passes to make journeys convenient for its passengers. Discounted passes are also there for elderly passengers, visually and physically challenged, reporters and freedom fighters. All passes can be obtained both online and offline. A pass can only be used in conjunction with an identity card issued by the PMPML at a cost of ₹ 20 (+ ₹ 5 for application). As of April 2018, a monthly pass valid for a month on all routes costs ₹ 1,400, while students and senior citizens need to pay ₹ 750 and ₹ 500, respectively. A day pass valid on all routes costs ₹ 70 and can only be obtained on board.

Depots

PMPML currently has 14 operational bus depots.

Issues

Operational losses 
PMPML has been incurring heavy operational losses ever since its formation in 2007. As per the merger contract, the PMC and PCMC bear 60% and 40% of the losses respectively. There have been disputes between the two civic bodies resulting in demands for dissolving the PMPML to form PMT and PCMT as they existed before 2007.

Insufficient fleet and poor maintenance  
PMPML is the sole public transport provider for the metropolitan area surrounding the twin cities of Pune and Pimpri-Chinchwad with a population of 5,057,709.  PMPML had a fleet of 1450 buses of which on an average only 1277 were operational. Thus at any given moment, c. 34% of its fleet was off roads, way above the limit of 20% per the norms set by the Central Institute of Road Transport (CIRT). This put the ratio of operational buses at c. 27 per 100,000 population. Reasons for these buses being off roads are mainly related to maintenance and frequent breakdowns due to several factors including insufficient manpower and facilities at PMPML depots and lack of preventive maintenance. PMPML also has a number of buses that are owned and maintained by private contractors which also suffer poor maintenance. Moreover, a significant number of buses in the fleet are older than 15 years while 746 buses are 10-15 years old making them prone to frequent breakdowns. Insufficient buses inevitably lead to overcrowding on the buses during peak hours with as many as three times the capacity riding a single bus.

To alleviate the problem of insufficient buses, PMPML had decided to buy 800 new diesel buses in 2017 postponing its initial plan of buying 550 air conditioned buses. The decision drew severe criticism regarding the environmental impact of diesel buses. Several NGOs and commuter groups suggested that PMPML should buy CNG buses instead. As a result, it was decided that 400 CNG and 400 diesel-run buses would be bought. However, CM Devendra Fadnavis insisted that PMPML concentrates on eco-friendly buses in April 2018. As of May 2018, PMPML planned to buy 500 electric air conditioned buses and 400 CNG buses.

Infrastructure 
PMPML does not have sufficient bus depots which leads to as many as half of the buses being parked on the streets in 2015. The drivers have also been blamed for parking haphazardly leading to traffic snarls in the busy areas of the city. According to a CIRT report, PMPML needs 18 depots as opposed to 13 in 2016-17. Recently, the development of new depots to solve the parking issue has gained some momentum. Bus shelters have been criticized for their condition, lack of seats, information, etc.

Safety and accidents 
In 2017-18, several buses caught fire which has put a big question mark on the safety of commuters. Between January 2017 and March 2018, a period of 15 months, the number of such incidents had reached 16 with almost one incident per month. In an answer to a query submitted under the Right to Information Act, it was revealed that PMPML owns only 124 fire extinguishers and most buses have neither undergone a fire safety audit nor do they have any fire extinguishers. PMPML have claimed that fire extinguishers on the buses are prone to theft. PMPML announced that all of its buses and facilities will undergo a fire safety audit and would be equipped with fire extinguishers by end of May 2018.

Notes

References
An Analysis of Economic Profitability of Municipal Transport Undertakings in India
The urban travel behavior and constraints of low income households and females in Pune, India. If PMT wants to improve its services in Pune, they must first learn from BEST (Mumbai's Bus Service) and train and motivate their conductors and drivers of PMT !

See also
 BEST Bus
 MSRTC
 Rainbow BRTS
 Pune Bus Pravasi Sangh

Municipal transport agencies of India
Transport in Pune
Companies based in Pune
Transport in Pimpri-Chinchwad
2007 establishments in Maharashtra
Indian companies established in 2007
Transport companies established in 2007